The 1822 Illinois gubernatorial election was Illinois's second gubernatorial election and its first competitive election. All candidates in the election represented the Democratic-Republican Party.

Results

References

Illinois Blue Book

Illinois
1822
Gubernatorial